Maria Josefin Asplund (born 15 October 1991) is a Swedish actress. She is known to international audiences for her roles as Astrid on the History Channel series Vikings and Pernilla Blomkvist in The Girl with the Dragon Tattoo (2011). She starred in the 2015 film adaptation of the Swedish novel The Circle.

Biography
Asplund grew up in the suburbs of Stockholm, Sweden, with her Polish mother, Swedish father and older sister. Asplund's parents divorced when she was 7 years old.

Asplund began acting at the local theater close to her home at the age of 6, where she played various characters in different musicals until her teenage years. During her childhood the stage was one of few places that truly felt like home, she said in an interview with Swedish Radio.

Later, Asplund studied acting at Södra Latins Gymnasium (Southern Latin secondary school), graduating in 2010. Shortly after, she was cast in David Fincher's adaptation of The Girl with the Dragon Tattoo opposite Daniel Craig. She played one of the lead roles in the film adaption (2015) of the best selling Swedish novel The Circle and gained international recognition through her role as Astrid in History Channel series Vikings.

Filmography

Film

Television

References

External links 

Living people
1991 births
Swedish film actresses
Swedish people of Polish descent